Grafovka is a rural locality (a selo) and the administrative center of Grafovskoye Rural Settlement, Shebekinsky District, Belgorod Oblast, Russia. The population was 1,611 as of 2010. There are 27 streets.

Geography 
Grafovka is located 18 km west of Shebekino (the district's administrative centre) by road. Bezlyudovka is the nearest rural locality.

References 

Rural localities in Shebekinsky District